Trevor Thompson (born June 20, 1994) is an American basketball player for Scafati Basket of the Italian Lega Basket Serie A. He played collegiate for Ohio State University.

Thompson is the son of former Major League Baseball player Ryan Thompson.

College career
As a freshman at Virginia Tech, Thompson averaged 5.0 points and 4.7 rebounds per game. He had 15 points and six rebounds against Duke. After the season, he decided to transfer to Ohio State, choosing the Buckeyes over offers from Indiana, Butler, and Purdue. He averaged 6.5 points and 5.1 rebounds per game as a sophomore and explored professional options before returning to Ohio State. As a junior at Ohio State, Thompson averaged 10.6 points and 9.2 rebounds per game and earned honorable mention All-Big Ten honors. Following the season, he decided to forgo his final season of eligibility to turn professional.

Professional career

Santa Cruz Warriors (2017–2018)
After going undrafted in the 2017 NBA Draft, Thompson was included in the Boston Celtics roster for 2017 NBA Summer League. On October 13, 2017, Thompson was signed with the Golden State Warriors, but was waived three days later.

On October 31, 2017, Thompson was included in the 2017-18 opening night roster for the Santa Cruz Warriors of the NBA G League.

Antibes Sharks (2018–2019)
On August 23, 2018, Thompson signed with the Antibes Sharks of the Pro A.

Antwerp Giants (2019) 
Thompson signed with the Antwerp Giants of the Belgian League on 24 January 2019.

Pieno žvaigždės Pasvalys (2019–2020) 
At the beginning of 2019-20 season, he has signed with Pieno žvaigždės Pasvalys of the Lithuanian Basketball League (LKL). He averaged  7.1 points and 6.6 rebounds per game.

Tuři Svitavy (2020) 
On March 4, 2020, he has signed with Tuři Svitavy of the Czech Národní Basketbalová Liga (NBL).

Kangoeroes Basket Mechelen (2020–2021) 
On May 24, 2020, Thompson signed with Kangoeroes Basket Mechelen of the Belgian Pro Basketball League.

Polski Cukier Toruń (2021) 
On July 27, 2021, Thompson signed with Polski Cukier Toruń of the Polish Basketball League (PLK). In 12 games, he averaged 15.2 points, 8.4 rebounds, and 1.1 assists per game.

Zadar (2021–2022) 
On November 26, 2021, Thompson signed with Zadar in the Croatian League and ABA League.

Scafati Basket (2022–present) 
On August 4, 2022, he has signed with Scafati Basket of the Italian Lega Basket Serie A.

References

1994 births
Living people
American expatriate basketball people in Belgium
American expatriate basketball people in France
American expatriate basketball people in Poland
American men's basketball players
Antwerp Giants players
Basketball players from Indianapolis
Centers (basketball)
KK Zadar players
Ohio State Buckeyes men's basketball players
Olympique Antibes basketball players
People from Long Island
Santa Cruz Warriors players
Scafati Basket players
Twarde Pierniki Toruń players
Virginia Tech Hokies men's basketball players